A round church is a church construction with a completely circular plan. There are many Nordic round churches in Sweden and Denmark (notably the island of Bornholm); round churches were popular in Scandinavia in the 11th and early 12th centuries.

Round churches should not be confused with the older types of round-tower church constructions. Churches with many-sided polygonal shapes (such as the 16-sided example in Richmond, Vermont, USA) are likewise colloquially referred to as 'round'.

Round churches by country

Armenia
Zvartnots Cathedral in Vagharshapat (Etchmiadzin), often cited as the world's largest round church during its existence in the Middle Ages

Bosnia
Church of the Holy Transfiguration in Sarajevo.

Brazil
Cathedral of Brasília

Bulgaria
Round Church, Preslav

Canada
 Our Lady of Victory Church, Inuvik
 St. Jude's Cathedral, Iqaluit
 Saint George's Round Church, Halifax

Croatia
Church of Saint Vitus in Rijeka.

Denmark

 Nyker Church
 Nylars Church
 Saint Ols Church
 Østerlars Church, Bornholm
 Bjernede Church, Zealand
 Horne Church, Funen (with later gothic extensions)
 Thorsager Church, Jutland.

Ethiopia

 Ura Kidane Mehret Church, Lake Tana

France
Medieval churches of Saint-Bonnet-la-Rivière and Neuvy-Saint-Sépulchre, Baroque churches as Chapelle de l'Oratoire, Avignon and Vieille Charité church, Marseille.

Germany
Aachen Cathedral. Liebfrauenkirche in Trier. St. Ludwig in Darmstadt, Hessen. There is also a round church in Untersuhl, Thuringia.

Hungary
 Saint Anne Church, Kallósd
 Roman Catholic Church in Kiszombor
 Rotunda, Öskü
 St. Jacob Rotunda, Ják,
 Neoclassical church, Balatonfüred (19th century)

Italy
 Church of Saint Stephen, Rome
 Church of Saint Bernard of Clairvaux, Rome
 Old Cathedral of Brescia
 Church of Saint Lawrence, Mantua
 Santo Stefano, Bologna
 Church of Saint Angelo, Perugia
 Church of Saint Marie, Forlì

Malta
Sarria Church
Rotunda of Mosta

The Netherlands
 Ronde Lutherse Kerk

Norway
 St. Olav's Abbey, Tønsberg

Philippines
Padre Pio Shrine, Santo Tomas, Batangas.
Church of the Holy Sacrifice in the campus of the University of the Philippines Diliman, Quezon City.

Portugal
Monastery of Serra do Pilar, a UNESCO World Heritage Site in Vila Nova de Gaia, Portugal.

Serbia
 Church of Saint Anthony of Padua at Red Cross, Belgrade
 Church of Saint Basil of Ostrog in New Belgrade
 Evangelical church in Zemun.

Spain
Sant Gregori Taumaturg, Barcelona
Iglesia San Marcos, Salamanca

Sweden
 Church ruins of Agnestad
 Bromma Church
 Ethiopian Orthodox Tewahedo Church in Stockholm
 Hagby Church
 
 Munsö Church
 Skörstorp Church
 Solna Church
 
 Valleberga Church
 
 Voxtorp Church.

United Kingdom
In England, there are four medieval round churches still in use: Holy Sepulchre, Cambridge; Temple Church, London; St John the Baptist Church, Little Maplestead, Essex, and The Holy Sepulchre, Northampton. St Chad's Church, Shrewsbury, is a Georgian round church, and the Liverpool Metropolitan Cathedral was built in the 20th century. The 18th-century All Saints' Church, Newcastle upon Tyne, is now part of the Evangelical Presbyterian Church in England and Wales.

In Scotland, the medieval Orphir Round Church near Houton on Mainland, Orkney, is in ruins. Kilarrow Parish Church at the top of main street in Bowmore is a round church, built in 1767, on the island of Islay, on Scotland's west coast.

Gallery

See also
 Round-tower church
 Irish round tower
 Rotunda (architecture)
 Norra begravningsplatsen

References
 Ann Vibeke Knudsen, The Old Churches of Bornholm. Bornholm Museum, Rønne, 1999.  .
<div class="references-large">

External links